Bhatti Vikramarka is a 1960 Indian Telugu-language swashbuckling adventure film, produced by P. V. V. Satyanarayana Murthy under the P.V.V.S.M. Productions banner and directed by Jampana. It stars N. T. Rama Rao, Anjali Devi, and Kanta Rao, with music composed by Pendyala Nageswara Rao. It is a commercial hit film that ran for 100 days. The film was dubbed into Tamil as Patti Vikramathithan.

Plot
The story is based on the historical characters of Bhatti and Vikramarka. Emperor Vikramarka (N. T. Rama Rao) with the help of brother Bhatti (Kanta Rao) are ruling Ujjain. He prays to Goddess Kali (Kanchana) and gets her appreciation. The Goddess blesses him that nobody can defeat him and gives him a diamond-studded sword. Indra (Mikkilineni) invites him to heaven and asks him a question; who is a better dancer, between Rambha and Urvashi. Vikramarka gives two garlands to them to wear and dance. The garland worn by Urvasi stays fresh, whereas that one worn by Rambha withers. He judges Urvasi as the best dancer, as she is fearless about her performance. Being satisfied with his answer, Indra presents him a throne carried by 32 Salabajhanjika and a powerful diamond chain. Indra also says that he will rule on this throne for 1000 years. Bhatti also prays to Mahakali and to satisfy her wish beheads Vikramarka. Kalika gives rebirth to Vikramarka and gives Bhatti 2000 years of life when Bhatti gets an idea and asks Vikramarka to sit on the throne for 6 months, so that both of them can live for 2000 years. In a forest, Mantra Siddha (S. V. Ranga Rao) a wizard, harasses people with his tricks and he wants to defeat Vikramarka by any means.

Once Vikramarka is touring the state with friend Tirakaasu (Relangi) when he gets the acquaintance with Prabavathi (Anjali Devi) the daughter of King Chandrasena. Knowing this, Mantra Siddha tries to kidnap Prabavathi but fails. Hence he orders his disciple Prachanda (Nagabhushanam) to attack Vikramarka and prevent him from attending Prabavati's Swayamvaram. Prachanda requests Vikramarka to help him in his endeavor to get Bhethala's power, but Vikramarka himself answers to the questions of Bhethala and kills Prachanda. Meanwhile, Mantra Siddha in Vikramarka's attire goes to Swayamvaram. At the time Prabhavathi is garlanding Mantra Siddha, Vikramarka enters into the court and defeats him. Frustrated, Mantra Siddha wants to take revenge, he steals Vikramarka's diamond chain and while Prabhavathi is going to her husband he captures her. In that fight, Prabavathi's father dies and escapes and reaches a tribal village where one person tries to molest her, but the leader saves her and dies. The rest of tribes want to offer her to the goddess. At that time, Mantra Siddha arrives in a sage form and takes her to his cave. Vikramarka with Bhatti starts searching for Prabhavathi, who is struggling to protect her chastity from Mantra Siddha. After some time, Tirakaasu reaches the cave. He plans along with Prabhavathi and learns about Mantra Siddha's life secret. Prabhavathi escapes and wants to reveal the secret to Vikramarka. But Mantra Siddha makes her dumb and old. Vikramarka does not recognize her and throws her out. Prabavathi in sorrow tries to commit suicide. Mantra Siddha grabs her, takes her back to cave and makes her normal. Tiraakasu reaches Vikramarka and reveals that the old woman is Prabhavathi then Vikramarka feels sorry for his behavior. Immediately he reaches the cave along with Bhatti and Tirakaasu when Mantra Siddha is trying to molest Prabhavathi. The war interfaces between Vikramarka and Mantra Siddha. Meanwhile, Prabhavathi reaches the secret place, after taking many risks, she achieves the life of Mantra Siddha. Vikramarka stamps out Mantra Siddha. Finally, the movie ends on a happy note with the reunion of Vikramarka and Prabhavathi.

Cast
N. T. Rama Rao as Vikramarka Maharaju
Anjali Devi as Prabhavathi Devi
Kanta Rao	as Bhatti
S. V. Ranga Rao as Mantra Siddha
Relangi as Tirakasu
Nagabhushanam as Prachandudu
Mikkilineni as Indra
Mukkamala
Balakrishna as Konangi
Kanchana as Goddess Kali
Girija as Arakasu
Sandhya
Seeta as Champa
T. D. Kusalakumari as Dancer

Soundtrack

Music composed by Pendyala Nageshwara Rao. Lyrics were written by Anishetty. Music released on Audio Company.

Tamil Songs
Music composed by T. M. Ibrahim. Playback singers are Seerkazhi Govindarajan, S. C. Krishnan, P. Leela, Jikki, P. Susheela, A. P. Komala & S. Janaki.

Production
There was fire Accident on the sets of Narasu Studios, Guindy, Madras on 13 March 1959. The Bhatti Vikramarka shooting required a fire, and a fire was made by using petrol and straw. Mukkamala and Anjali Devi were on the sets. The bamboo setting was ablaze and the flames rose high fast. The fire spread to the adjacent sets too and caused a huge damage of a lakh and half rupees. It took them for more than 90 minutes for the fire brigades to bring the fire under control. This was the worst fire disaster in the history of Telugu cinema.

References

External links
 

1960 films
Indian black-and-white films
1960s Telugu-language films
Films scored by Pendyala Nageswara Rao
Memorials to Vikramaditya
Films scored by T. M. Ibrahim
Films directed by Jampana